Red Dress Boutique is a women's clothing store located in Athens, Georgia which also sells retail online. It appeared on Season 6 of Shark Tank where it was offered a $1.2 million investment.

History

Red Dress Boutique was founded by Diana Harbour in 2005. During her college years at Columbus State University, she grew to love small fashion boutiques while working at three small clothing shops. She opened her first boutique on Baxter street in Athens, Georgia because of the area's thriving local business scene and lack of chain stores. A second Red Dress Boutique location followed but later closed. An eCommerce site launched on December 6, 2009. In 2014, the company made $15 million in online sales.

The company appeared on Season 6 of Shark Tank where Mark Cuban and Robert Herjavec split a $1.2 million investment in exchange for 20% equity in the company.

Diana Harbour bought back her equity from Mark Cuban on January 17, 2019. The news was made public on their Instagram feed. It was not disclosed what the purchase amount was for the buyback.

References

External links 
 Official website

Retail companies established in 2005
Clothing retailers of the United States
Companies based in Athens, Georgia
2005 establishments in Georgia (U.S. state)
Clothing companies established in 2005